Midland Railroad may refer to the following railroads:

Florida Midland Railroad (current)
Florida Midland Railroad (defunct)
Midland Railroad (Massachusetts)
Midland Railroad (Vermont), a Vermont railroad
New Jersey Midland Railway

See also
 Midland Railway (disambiguation)
 Midland Line (disambiguation)